is a Japanese professional wrestler currently working for the Japanese professional wrestling promotion DDT Pro-Wrestling (DDT).

Professional wrestling career

DDT Pro-Wrestling (2010-present)
Hirata's first known match as a professional wrestler was a loss against Keisuke Ishii for the Ironman Heavymetalweight Championship at Judgement 2010 on March 14, 2010, however, he is known to have previously defeated Michael Nakazawa at a promotion's house show on February 28, 2010 to win the title. He is known for his affiliation with various stables such as T2Hii in which he paired with Sanshiro Takagi and Toru Owashi to win the KO-D 6-Man Tag Team Championship at Dramatic General Election 2014 Final Voting Day - Last Hope Special on September 28, 2014 from Team Dream Futures (Keisuke Ishii, Shigehiro Irie and Soma Takao). The other stable he took part in is Disaster Box, and he teamed up with fellow stablemates Toru Owashi and Yuki Ueno to unsuccessfully challenge Damnation (Mad Paulie, Soma Takao and Tetsuya Endo at Ryōgoku Peter Pan on October 21 for the KO-D 6-Man Tag Team Championship.  Hirata participated in a cross-over event held between DDT and Big Japan Pro Wrestling, the BJW/DDT Kumamoto Earthquake Reconstruction Assistance Charity Pro-Wrestling on July 2, 2016, where he teamed up with Speed Of Sounds (Hercules Senga and Tsutomu Oosugi) and with his T2Hii fellow stable member Sanshiro Takagi to defeat The Brahman Brothers (Brahman Kei, Brahman Shu), Danshoku Dino and Takayuki Ueki in an 8-man tag team match. The event helped raising charity money for the disaster caused by the Kumamoto Earthquake which hit Japan back in 2016. At Kawasaki Strong 2021 on February 14, Hirata teamed up with Shinya Aoki, Super Sasadango Machine and Antonio Honda to defeat Sanshiro Takagi, Danshoku Dino, Toru Owashi and Makoto Oishi for the KO-D 8-Man Tag Team Championship.

New Japan Pro-Wrestling (2011)
Hirata wrestled a few of matches for New Japan Pro-Wrestling. One of them was a singles match loss against Hiromu Takahashi at NEVER.5 on February 24, 2011 and the other two were also two losses, one against Madoka and a tag team match in which he teamed up with Shinichiro Tominaga against Hiromu Takahashi and Kyosuke Mikami, both of the matches being part of the NEVER.6: Road To The Super Junior 2 Days Tournament.

Championships and accomplishments
DDT Pro-Wrestling
Ironman Heavymetalweight Championship (41 times)
KO-D 6-Man Tag Team Championship (5 times, current) – with Sanshiro Takagi and Toru Owashi (3), Akito and Shota (1), and Naruki Doi and Toru Owashi (1)
KO-D 8-Man Tag Team Championship (2 times) – with Shinya Aoki, Super Sasadango Machine and Antonio Honda (1), and Toru Owashi, Antonio Honda and Yoshihiko (1)

References

External links

1987 births
Living people
Japanese male professional wrestlers
21st-century professional wrestlers
Ironman Heavymetalweight Champions
KO-D 6-Man Tag Team Champions
KO-D 8-Man/10-Man Tag Team Champions